Henan Subdistrict is a subdistrict in Jiaohe, Jilin province, China. , it has 26 villages under its administration. The subdistrict had a population of 14,643 according to the 2000 Chinese Census, but has since underwent boundary changes, bringing its population up to 31,171 as of 2005.

History 
Chishui Township, which would be merged into Henan Subdistrict in 2005, was established as a district in 1949, but would change to a township in 1956, to a people's commune in 1958, and then again to a township in 1983.

Henan Subdistrict was created from the town of Jiaohe in 1989.

In 2005, Henan Subdistrict transferred Tuanjie Village and Xinli Village to neighboring Hebei Subdistrict as part of its promotion from a township to a subdistrict. During this process, portions of Henan Subdistrict which were not initially portions of these two villages were merged into them, as part of the transfer. Furthermore, Henan Subdistrict transferred Xiaobajiazi Village to neighboring . In return, seven villages from neighboring , including Anle Village and Xinli Village (not to be confused with the one transferred to Hebei Subdistrict), were incorporated into Henan Subdistrict. Henan Subdistrict also gained all as eight villages from the now-defunct Chishui Township, which was now merged into Henan Subidstrict.

Administrative divisions 
The subdistrict has jurisdiction over the following 26 administrative villages:

 Xianfeng Village
 Xinmin Village
 Xinsheng Village
 Yangmulinzi Village
 Xihuangdi Village
 Xintun Village
 Donghuangdi Village
 Zhishu Village
 Dongxiaojiaohe Village
 Nanxiaojiaohe Village
 Dehegou Village
 Huanghua Village
 Nandianzi Village
 Wanbao Village
 Hongsheng Village
 Kouqin Village
 Xinli Village
 Anle Village
 Chishui Village
 Liushulinzi Village
 Nianzigou Village
 Dengchang Village
 Baojia Village
 Zhenxing Village
 Bashangde Village
 Mangniuhe Village

Transportation 
National Highway 302 passes through Henan Subdistrict.

See also 
 List of township-level divisions of Jilin

References 

Township-level divisions of Jilin
Jiaohe, Jilin